Roebuck, also originally known as "Rabuck", is a townland and the name of a former estate in the baronys of Dublin, Uppercross, and Rathdown in Ireland. 

The townland incorporates roughly all the land in the triangle between Clonskeagh, Dundrum and Mount Merrion. Historically significant buildings which exist (or existed) in the area include Mountainville House, Mount Anville, St. Thomas's Church, Owenstown House, Roebuck Hill, Hermitage House, Friarsland House, Prospect Hall, Froebuck Park, Belfield House and Harlech House.

Roebuck became established as a location shortly after the Norman invasion of Ireland (from 1169). In 1261, it was owned by Fromund Le Brun, the Lord Chancellor of Ireland, and a castle was built there in the 13th century, which was badly damaged in the Irish Rebellion of 1641. It was pictured in a ruinous condition by Gabriel Beranger around 1768. It was sold by Nicholas Barnewall, 14th Baron Trimlestown, to James Crofton, an official of the Irish Treasury, in around 1800.

In 1466, Elizabeth le Brun, the last of Fromund's family, married Robert Barnewall, 1st Baron Trimlestown. The Irish Civil Survey of 1654-56 recorded that the estate consisted of around 500 acres. It remained in the hands of the Trimlestown family until the early nineteenth century when parts were sold off. The surgeon Solomon Richards acquired land in the area of the estate known as Roebuck Grove from Baron Trimlestown in 1812.

The estate was acquired by the Westby family in 1856 and from 1943 until 1985 it was owned by the Little Sisters of the Poor. It later became part of the University College Dublin campus.

See also
 Baron Trimlestown
 Nixon baronets

References

External links 
 
http://humphrysfamilytree.com/Barnewall/nicholas.crickstown.html

Townlands of County Dublin
University College Dublin
Castles in County Dublin